After Five is a 1915 American silent thriller comedy film directed by Cecil B. DeMille and Oscar Apfel. Based on the play of the same name by DeMille and his brother William, the film stars Edward Abeles.

Plot
Ted Ewing (Edward Abeles) invests both his own and the money of his fiancée, Nora Heldreth (Betty Schade), when a broker friend offers big investment returns. After the broker friend disappears, though, Ewing believes that he has squandered their money, and sets out on a course of action to recover it.  He takes out a life insurance policy and then tries to get himself "accidentally" killed.  His numerous attempts are to no avail.  Next he hires some strong arms to kill him since they have apparently been following him anyway.  He gives the money for his murder for hire to his valet, Oki (Sessue Hayakawa). But then the broker returns and Ewing discovers that his investment has doubled!  With the strong arms after him, Ewing must straighten out the situation before it's too late.

Cast
 Edward Abeles as Ted Ewing
 Sessue Hayakawa as Oki, the Valet
 Betty Schade as Nora Hildreth
 Jane Darwell as Mrs. Russell, 'Aunt Diddy'
 Theodore Roberts as Bruno Schwartz
 Monroe Salisbury as Sam Parker
 James Neil 
 Ernest Joy
 Jode Mullally
 Ernest Garcia

References

External links

1915 films
1915 comedy films
1910s comedy thriller films
American comedy thriller films
American silent feature films
American black-and-white films
American films based on plays
Films directed by Cecil B. DeMille
Films directed by Oscar Apfel
Paramount Pictures films
1910s American films
Silent American comedy films
Silent thriller films